Albert Budak (born January 27, 1985) is a French professional football player. Currently, he plays in the Championnat de France amateur for AFC Compiègne.

He played on the professional level in Ligue 2 for CS Sedan Ardennes.

1985 births
Living people
French footballers
Ligue 2 players
CS Sedan Ardennes players
La Vitréenne FC players
Stade Lavallois players
AFC Compiègne players
Association football defenders